The 2010 Thai Premier League was the 14th season of the Thai Premier League since its establishment in 1996. A total of 16 teams competed in the league, with Muangthong United as the defending champions.

League Expansion
It was announced at the end of the season that the TPL would increase the number of teams for the start of the 2011 Thai Premier League season. Therefore, at the end of season the three teams in the Thai Premier League that finished the season in the bottom three places (14th, 15th and 16th) would face the fourth, fifth and sixth teams from Division One in a promotion/relegation series.

The six teams will be divided into two groups of three. They will meet each other in their group on a home-and-away basis with the winner of each group earning spots in the top flight next season.

Thai Premier League All-Star Exhibition game

Personnel and sponsoring

Teams
Sriracha, Chula United and Nakhon Pathom were relegated to the 2010 Thai Division 1 League after finishing the 2009 season in the bottom three places.

The three relegated teams were replaced by 2009 Thai Division 1 League champions Police United, runners-up Royal Thai Army and third place Sisaket.

TTM Samut Sakhon and PEA were renamed to TTM Phichit and Buriram PEA, they moved location to Phichit and Buriram. PEA renamed after the club takeover by Newin Chidchob. TOT were renamed too, they were renamed to TOT-CAT.

Stadium and locations

1 Second half of season played at Bangkok University Stadium former home in Rangsit
2 Moved from Nong Chok Stadium during renovation
3 Ground share with Muangthong United during TOT Stadium Chaeng Watthana renovation

Managerial changes

Ownership changes

League table

Playoffs

Group A

1 Nakhon Pathom were suspended for two years following the final playoff game, all results stood.

Group B

Results

Season statistics

Top scorers

Top assists

Hat-tricks

Awards

Monthly awards

Annual awards

TPL Player of the Year
The Player of the Year was awarded to:
Goalkeeper of the Year – Kawin Thamsatchanan
Defender of the Year – Nattaporn Phanrit
Midfielder of the Year – Therdsak Chaiman
Striker of the Year – Sarayoot Chaikamdee

TPL Young Player of the Year
The Young Player of the Year was awarded to Phuritad Jarikanon.

TPL Head Coach of the Year
The Head Coach of the Year was awarded to René Desaeyere.

TPL Fair Play Award
The Fair Play Award was given to Osotspa Saraburi.

See also
 2010 Thai Division 1 League
 2010 Regional League Division 2
 2010 Thai FA Cup
 2010 Kor Royal Cup

References

External links
Official website

2010
1